Bardet–Biedl syndrome 1 protein is a protein that in humans is encoded by the BBS1 gene.
BBS1 is part of the BBSome complex, which required for ciliogenesis. 
Mutations in this gene have been observed in patients with the major form (type 1) of Bardet–Biedl syndrome.

History
, research results indicated that the encoded protein may play a role in eye, limb, cardiac and reproductive system development.

References

External links
 GeneReviews/NIH/NCBI/UW entry on Bardet–Biedl syndrome

External links

Further reading